Pier Paolo Vergerio (the Elder) (23 July 1370 – 8 July 1444 or 1445) was an Italian humanist, statesman, pedagogist and canon lawyer.

Life
Vergerio was born at Capodistria, Istria, then in the Republic of Venice.  He studied rhetoric at Padua, canon law at Florence (1387–89) and at Bologna (1389–90).  He is noted for writing to Pope Innocent VII and Pope Gregory XII. Hans Baron writes in The Crisis of the Early Italian Renaissance, 1966 edition, p.134, "The catastrophe of 1405 ruined Vergerio's career as a humanist" (This refers to Padua losing its independence in 1405).

Later he became canon of Ravenna and took part in the Council of Constance in 1414. The next year he was one of the fifteen delegates who accompanied the Emperor Sigismund to Perpignan, where an endeavour was made to induce Pope Benedict XIII to renounce his claims. From 1417 to his death he was secretary to the Emperor Sigismund.

In July 1420, he was the chief orator of the Catholic party at the Hussite disputation at Prague. Though never married and probably in minor orders, he was not a priest.  He died at Buda, Kingdom of Hungary, aged 73 or 74.

Pier Paolo Vergerio was the first to publish Petrarch's Africa for the public in 1396–1397.

Works
The following of his works have been printed:
"De ingenuis moribus ac liberalibus studiis" (Venice, 1472)
"De Republica Veneta liber primus" (Toscolano, 1526)
"Vita Petrarcae", edited by Tommassini in "Petrarca redivivus" (Padua, 1701)
"Pro redintegranda uniendaque Ecclesia" edited with introduction and notes by Combi in "Archivio storico per Trieste, l'Istria ed il Trentino" (Rome, 1882), 351-74
"Historia principum Carrariensium ad annum circiter MXXXLV" edited by Muratori, "Rerum ital. Script.", XVI, 113-184

His letters, 146 in number, were edited by Luciani (Venice, 1887). There are still in manuscript: a Latin version of Arrian's "Gesta Alexandri Magni"; a Life of Seneca; a panegyric on St. Jerome; a few comedies, satires, and other poems.

His On Good Manners (1402) is characterised by Quentin Skinner as the first treatise about the proper education of princes.

References
Bergin, Thomas G. and Wilson, Alice S., Petrarch's Africa English translation.  New Haven. Yale University Press 1977. 
Bischoff, Studien zu P. P. Vergerio dem Aeltern (Berlin, 1909)
Everson, Jane E., The Italian romance epic in the age of humanism: the matter of Italy and the world of Rome, Oxford University Press, 2001, 
Kopp, Pietro Paolo Vergerio der erste humanistische Padagog (Lucerne, 1894)
Baduber, P. P. Vergerio il seniore (Capodistria, 1866)
Woodward, Vittorino da Feltre and other Humanist Educators (Cambridge, 1897)
Jachino, Del pedagogista Pier Paolo Vergerio (Florence, 1894)
Buschbell, Reformation und Inquisition in Italien und die Mite des 16. Jahrhunderts (Paderborn, 1910), 103–54.

Notes

1370 births
1440s deaths
Canon law jurists
Italian Renaissance humanists
Writers from Koper
14th-century Italian jurists
15th-century Italian jurists
14th-century dramatists and playwrights
15th-century Latin writers